Helmut Ullrich is a former international table tennis player from Germany.

He won a bronze medal at the 1936 World Table Tennis Championships in the mixed doubles with Annemarie Schulz.

See also
 List of table tennis players
 List of World Table Tennis Championships medalists

References

German male table tennis players
World Table Tennis Championships medalists